Communauté d'agglomération de la Région de Château-Thierry is the communauté d'agglomération, an intercommunal structure, centred on the town of Château-Thierry. It is located in the Aisne department, in the Hauts-de-France region, northern France. Created in 2017, its seat is in Étampes-sur-Marne. Its area is 880.0 km2. Its population was 54,491 in 2019, of which 15,254 in Château-Thierry proper.

Composition
The communauté d'agglomération consists of the following 87 communes:

Armentières-sur-Ourcq
Azy-sur-Marne
Barzy-sur-Marne
Belleau
Beuvardes
Bézu-Saint-Germain
Blesmes
Bonneil
Bonnesvalyn
Bouresches
Brasles
Brécy
Brumetz
Bruyères-sur-Fère
Bussiares
Celles-lès-Condé
Le Charmel
Chartèves
Château-Thierry
Chézy-en-Orxois
Chierry
Cierges
Coincy
Condé-en-Brie
Connigis
Coulonges-Cohan
Courboin
Courchamps
Courmont
Courtemont-Varennes
Crézancy
La Croix-sur-Ourcq
Dhuys-et-Morin-en-Brie
Dravegny
Épaux-Bézu
Épieds
Essômes-sur-Marne
Étampes-sur-Marne
Étrépilly
Fère-en-Tardenois
Fossoy
Fresnes-en-Tardenois
Gandelu
Gland
Goussancourt
Grisolles
Hautevesnes
Jaulgonne
Latilly
Licy-Clignon
Loupeigne
Mareuil-en-Dôle
Mézy-Moulins
Monthiers
Monthurel
Montigny-l'Allier
Montigny-lès-Condé
Montlevon
Mont-Saint-Père
Nanteuil-Notre-Dame
Nesles-la-Montagne
Neuilly-Saint-Front
Nogentel
Pargny-la-Dhuys
Passy-sur-Marne
Priez
Reuilly-Sauvigny
Rocourt-Saint-Martin
Ronchères
Rozet-Saint-Albin
Rozoy-Bellevalle
Saint-Eugène
Saint-Gengoulph
Saponay
Sergy
Seringes-et-Nesles
Sommelans
Torcy-en-Valois
Trélou-sur-Marne
Vallées en Champagne
Verdilly
Vézilly
Vichel-Nanteuil
Viffort
Villeneuve-sur-Fère
Villers-Agron-Aiguizy
Villers-sur-Fère

References

Chateau-Thierry
Chateau-Thierry